Malta Dockyard was an important naval base in the Grand Harbour in Malta in the Mediterranean Sea. The infrastructure which is still in operation is now operated by Palumbo Shipyards.

History

Pre-1800
The Knights of Malta established dockyard facilities within the Grand Harbour to maintain their fleet of galleys. These were spread between the cities of Senglea, Cospicua and Vittoriosa.

19th century

When Malta became a British protectorate in 1800, these facilities were inherited, and gradually consolidated, by the Royal Navy. With the loss of Menorca, Malta swiftly became the Navy's principal Mediterranean base.

The Royal Navy Dockyard was initially located around Dockyard Creek in Bormla, and occupied several of the dockyard buildings formerly used by the Knights of Malta. By 1850 the facilities included storehouses, a ropery, a small steam factory, victualling facilities, houses for the officers of the Yard, and most notably a dry dock – the first to be provided for a Royal Dockyard outside Britain. Begun in 1844, the dry dock was opened in 1847; ten years later it was extended to form a double dock (No. 1 and No. 2 dock).

In the second half of the century the steam factory with its machine shops and foundries was expanded. Very soon, though, it was clear that more space was required than the crowded wharves of Dockyard Creek afforded, to accommodate the increasing size of ships and the increasing size of the fleet based there. The decision was taken to expand into the adjacent French Creek, and between 1861 and 1909 a further five dry docks—three single plus one double dock—were constructed there, along with an assortment of specialized buildings to serve the mechanized Navy.

20th century

It was an important supply base during the First World War and the Second World War. In January 1941 sixty German dive bombers made a massed attack on the dockyard in an attempt to destroy the damaged British aircraft carrier , but she received only one bomb hit. Incessant German and Italian bombing raids targeted Malta through March, opposed by only a handful of British fighters. Then in April 1942 the Admiral Superintendent of Malta Dockyard reported that due to German air attacks on Malta's naval base "practically no workshops were in action other than those underground; all docks were damaged; electric power, light and telephones were largely out of action."

The dockyard was handed over to Messrs C.H. Bailey of South Wales, a civilian firm of ship repairers and marine engineers, on the morning of 30 March 1959. At a ceremony the previous day in the Red State Room of the Palace of Valletta, before Navy and civilian officials, the Fourth Sea Lord had handed over a ceremonial key to the Governor of Malta, who had then passed it to the chairman of Bailey. At the time it was intended that "the yard would continue to be supplied with naval repair work, which would diminish as commercial activities expanded." Supervision of residual naval work in the dockyard would be carried out by personnel under the direction of the Flag Officer Malta.

After Baileys were dispossessed by the Maltese Government, by February 1968, the dockyard was closed as a naval base and the Royal Navy withdrew completely in 1979. It was then managed by a workers' council between 1979 and 1996 repairing civilian ships.

21st century
In 2010, Malta Shipyards Ltd was placed into liquidation and its assets were given over to Palumbo Shipyards. In the course of its government ownership, the dockyard had accumulated €1bn in losses. In 2011, Palumbo acquired on a 30-year lease the neighbouring "superyacht" facility, which includes a drydock with a retractable roof.

Administration of Malta Dockyard
The dockyard was initially managed by a Resident Commissioner of the Navy Board from 1791 until 1832 when all Resident Commissioners at dockyards were replaced by Superintendents. Admirals Superintendent included:

Resident commissioners
Post holders included:
 1791– 1793  Captain Harry Harmood   (co-held title at Gibraltar)
 1793–1796 Captain Andrew Sutherland  (co-held title at Gibraltar)
 1801–1803 Captain John Nicholson Inglefield (co-held title at Gibraltar)
 1803–1805 Captain Sir Alexander John Ball (co-held title at Gibraltar)
 1805–1807 Captain William Brown 
 1808–1811 Captain William Granville Lobb  
 1811–1812 Captain Percy Fraser 
 1812–1829 Captain Joseph Larcom
 1829–1832 Thomas Briggs (Admiral Superintendent to 1838)

Admiral superintendents
 1832–1838 Rear Admiral Thomas Briggs
 1838–1843 Rear Admiral John Louis
 1843–1848 Rear Admiral Lucius Curtis
 1848–1853 Rear Admiral Edward Harvey
 1853–1855 Rear Admiral Houston Stewart
 1855–1858 Rear Admiral Montagu Stopford
 1858–1863 Rear Admiral Henry Codrington
 1863–1864 Rear Admiral Horatio Austin
 1864–1868 Rear Admiral Henry Kellett
 1868–1870 Rear Admiral Edward Fanshawe
 1870–1872 Rear Admiral Astley Key
 1872–1876 Rear Admiral Edward Inglefield
 1876–1878 Rear Admiral Edward Rice
 1878–1879 Rear Admiral William Luard
 1879–1882 Rear Admiral John McCrea
 1882–1885 Rear Admiral William Graham
 1885–1887 Rear Admiral William Ward
 1887–1889 Rear Admiral Robert Douglas
 1889–1892 Rear Admiral Alexander Buller
 1892–1894 Rear Admiral Richard Tracey
 1894–1897 Rear Admiral Richard Duckworth-King
 1897–1900 Rear Admiral Rodney Lloyd
 1900–1902 Rear Admiral Burges Watson
 1902–1905 Rear Admiral James Hammet
 1905–1907 Rear Admiral Arthur Bromley
 1907–1910 Rear Admiral Frederic Fisher
 1910–1912 Rear Admiral Ernest Simons
 1912–1914 Rear Admiral Sackville Carden
 1914–1916 Rear Admiral Arthur Limpus
 1916–1918 Rear-Admiral George Ballard
 1918–1921 Rear Admiral Brian Barttelot
 1921–1924 Rear Admiral John Luce (Rear-Admiral in Charge, Malta, and Admiral Superintendent, Malta Dockyard)
 1924–1926 Rear Admiral Charles Johnson (Rear-Admiral in Charge, Malta, and Admiral Superintendent, Malta Dockyard)
 1926–1928 Rear Admiral Alexander Campbell (Rear-Admiral in Charge, Malta, and Admiral Superintendent, Malta Dockyard)
 1928–1931 Rear Admiral Francis Mitchell (Rear-Admiral in Charge, Malta, and Admiral Superintendent, Malta Dockyard)
 1931–1934 Rear Admiral Matthew Best (Rear-Admiral in Charge, Malta, and Admiral Superintendent, Malta Dockyard)
 1934–1937 Vice Admiral Sir Wilfred French (Rear-Admiral (later Vice-Admiral) in Charge, Malta, and Admiral Superintendent, Malta Dockyard)
 1937–1941 Vice Admiral Sir Wilbraham Ford (Vice-Admiral in Charge, Malta, and Admiral Superintendent, Malta Dockyard)

From 1941-1945 the post of Superintendent, H.M. Dockyard was separated from that of Flag Officer-in-Charge, Malta

 1941-1943 Rear Admiral (ret.) K. H. L. Mackenzie (Naval Superintendent, Malta Dockyard) 
 1943-1945 Rear Admiral (ret.) P. K. Kekewich (Naval Superintendent, Malta Dockyard)

Flag Officer-in-Charge, Malta
 1941–1942 Vice Admiral Sir Ralph Leatham
 1942–1943 Vice Admiral Sir Stuart Bonham Carter 
 May–Oct 1943 Vice Admiral Arthur Power

Vice Admiral, Malta and Flag Officer, Central Mediterranean
 1943–1945 Vice Admiral Sir Louis Hamilton
 1945–1946 Vice Admiral Sir Frederick Dalrymple-Hamilton

Flag Officer, Malta
 1946–1948 Rear Admiral Marcel Kelsey
 1948–1950 Rear Admiral Philip Clarke
 1950–1952 Vice Admiral Sir Geoffrey Hawkins
 1952–1954 Rear Admiral Jocelyn Salter
 1954–1957 Rear Admiral Wilfred Brittain
 1957–1959 Vice Admiral Sir Charles Madden
 1959–1961 Rear Admiral Derick Hetherington
 1961–1963 Rear Admiral Viscount Kelburn
Note: The post was vacant between 1963 and 1967
 1967–1969 Rear Admiral Dudley Davenport
 1969–1971 Rear Admiral Derrick Kent
 1971–1973 Rear Admiral John Templeton-Cotill
 1973–1975 Rear Admiral David Loram
 1975–1979 Rear Admiral Sir Nigel Cecil

Gallery

References

Sources
Macintyre, Donald, The Naval War Against Hitler, New York: Charles Scribner's Sons, 1971

Royal Navy dockyards
Cospicua
Senglea
Birgu
Military installations of Malta
Malta–United Kingdom military relations
Ports and harbours of Malta